Union Bank & Trust Company is a privately owned, state chartered commercial bank headquartered in Lincoln, Nebraska.  The bank was founded on February 28, 1917, under the name Farmer's State Bank.  The name was changed to Union Bank in 1935, then to its current name in 1959 with the addition of trust powers.  The bank was purchased by the Dunlap family of Nebraska, its current owners, in 1965.  As of December 31, 2007, Union Bank had over $1.65 billion in bank assets, over $9.25 billion in Trust assets under management, 15 branches in Lincoln, another 15 throughout Nebraska, and two in Kansas.

Union Bank maintains relationships with several other companies, the most prominent being Nelnet. In 2018, UB&T was involved in a financial dispute with NASCAR race team BK Racing which saw the team being dissolved in bankruptcy court and a lawsuit over one of NASCAR's charters sold to Front Row Motorsports by BK at the end of 2016.

External links 
Union Bank Home Page

References 

Banks based in Nebraska
Banks established in 1917
Privately held companies based in Nebraska